Scoparia sinuata is a species of moth in the family Crambidae. It is endemic to New Zealand.

Taxonomy

This species was described by Alfred Philpott in 1930. However the placement of this species within the genus Scoparia is in doubt. As a result, this species has also been referred to as Scoparia (s.l.) sinuata.

Description

The wingspan is 18–19 mm. The forewings are pale brown, mixed with blackish along the costa. The first line is white and margined with black posteriorly. The second line is also white and there is a subterminal whitish shade. The hindwings are very pale ochreous, clouded with brown. Adults have been recorded on wing in February.

References

Moths described in 1930
Moths of New Zealand
Scorparia
Endemic fauna of New Zealand
Endemic moths of New Zealand